Visitors to the Marshall Islands must obtain a visa in advance unless they come from one of the visa exempt countries or countries whose citizens are eligible for a visa on arrival.

Visa policy map

Visa free countries
Holders of passports of the following 32 jurisdictions do not require a visa for entry to the Marshall Islands:

Marshall Islands signed mutual visa-waiver agreements with Saint Kitts and Nevis on 29 October 2019 and Ukraine on 28 November 2019 but they are yet to be ratified.

Visa on arrival
Citizens of the following 63(+1) countries and territories may obtain a visa upon arrival valid for a maximum stay of 90 days:

Citizens of these countries are not exempted from providing Immigration with required documents to support their visa which include a recent police record and health clearance (proof of being free from HIV/AIDS and TB), they only provide these documents on arrival.

All visitors must hold a passport valid for 6 months. 

According to Timatic, visitors wishing to travel to Kwajalein are required to hold an Entry Authorization issued by the United States Military, which can be obtained on arrival. However, visitors will need to travel to Ebeye at their own expense if the Entry Authorization is not ready for collection.

See also

Visa requirements for Marshallese citizens

References

External links 
Immigration Act 2006

Marshall Islands
Foreign relations of the Marshall Islands